Parietal scale refers to the scales of a snake which are on the head of the snake and are connected to the frontals towards the posterior. These scales are analogous to and take their name from the parietal bone which forms the roof and sides of the cranium in humans.

See also
 Parietal bone
 Snake scales
 Anatomical terms of location

Snake scales

They are also great for protecting themselves